Corruption in Vietnam is pervasive and widespread, due to weak legal infrastructure, financial unpredictability, and conflicting and negative bureaucratic decision-making. Surveys reveal that while petty corruption has decreased slightly throughout the country, high-level corruption has significantly increased as a means of abuse of political power. Corruption is a very significant problem in Vietnam, impacting all aspects of administration, education and law enforcement.

Vietnam is an authoritarian one-party state under the Communist Party of Vietnam (CPV). The party claims that corruption has moved up the political agenda in the country, and the legal framework for tackling corruption has become "better developed". However, political academics have cited that such efforts are likely a cover for a political purge between factions of the party. 

Vietnam also scores one of the highest rates in terms of bribery practices – the rate citizens have paid a bribe to key public institutions over the past 12 months, at 65%, is second only to India with 69%. Corruption is considered an obstacle for doing business in Vietnam, and the use of facilitation payments are widespread when dealing with frontline civil servants in all levels of society.

Ranking
Transparency International's 2021 Corruption Perception Index ranks the country 87th out of 180 countries with a score of 39/100, where a lower score corresponds to a widespread perception of corruption in the public sector. It is below average for the region.

Pervasiveness of corruption in Vietnam 
Vietnam is a developing country of about 96 million people. Due to the international view of corruption in Vietnam, in 2020, foreign direct investment (FDI) in Vietnam stands at only US$28.5 billion, far below its ASEAN neighbours.

Anti-corruption efforts 
The Vietnamese government has claimed that it has taken efforts to combat corruption, although its effects remain to be seen.

Officials implicated by the anti-corruption campaigns in Vietnam 
 Đinh La Thăng: former Minister of Transport, former Communist Party Secretary of Ho Chi Minh City, and former member of the Politburo.
 Nguyễn Đức Chung: former Major General of the Vietnam People's Public Security and Vietnamese politician. He is a former Chairman of the Hanoi People's Committee.
 Nguyễn Thanh Long: Minister of Health from July 2020 to his removal from the Communist Party of Vietnam in June 2022 for involvement in the Việt Á corruption scandal.
 Trịnh Xuân Thanh: Former Vietnamese politician and businessman. He is the former head of the state-owned Petrovietnam Construction Joint Stock Corporation (a subsidiary of Petrovietnam), and the former Deputy-Chairman of the Provincial People's Committee of Hậu Giang.
 Nguyễn Xuân Phúc: Former President of Vietnam implacated in the Việt Á scandal. Resigned on January 23 2023
 Dương Bá Thanh Dân: Director of the Department of Medical Supplies at the Center for Disease Control and Prevention, or CDC, in the Southeastern Province of Ninh Thuan, and his employee Nguyễn Đăng Đức.
 Đào Hữu Long: Director of Thua Thien Hue Provincial Registration Center.

See also 

 PMU 18 scandal
 Việt Á scandal
 Crime in Vietnam

References

External links
 Vietnam Corruption Profile from the Business Anti-Corruption Portal

Vietnam
Politics of Vietnam
Crime in Vietnam by type
Society of Vietnam